Iryna Leanidauna Vaskouskaya (born 2 April 1991) is a Belarusian athlete who specialises in the triple jump. She has qualified for 2016 Summer Olympics.

Personal bests

Outdoor

Indoor

References

External links 
 

1991 births
Living people
Belarusian female triple jumpers
Athletes (track and field) at the 2016 Summer Olympics
Olympic athletes of Belarus